Hawksmoor is a British steakhouse and cocktail bar chain.

Development
The restaurant was founded by Will Beckett and Huw Gott in 2006.  They had previously worked in bars and kitchens in London's East End and opened their new bar/restaurant on Commercial Street.  Their plan was to offer high-quality, well-butchered beef, so they tasted a range of beef from all over the world, until coming to the conclusion that the best tasting steak was from the UK.

Their second branch in Seven Dials was opened in 2010.  This was especially successful and the turnover of their company, Underdog, increased from £4 million to £11 million.

In 2013, the founders sold a majority stake in the chain to the private equity group Graphite Capital — investors in other London businesses such as the Groucho Club and Wagamama.  The valuation was £35 million but the founders planned to continue to work and invest in the business.

The company has been ranked three star Sunday Times Best Companies for eight consecutive years (in 2014 was the best restaurant company to work for), three star Sustainable Restaurant Association award as well as being involved in variety of charity projects (predominantly for Action Against Hunger, for which Hawksmoor has raised/donated over £1m).

Reception
Giles Coren, reviewing the Seven Dials branch in The Times, praised it as "great, great steak. Best you’ll find anywhere. ... cooked medium rare at Hawksmoor's suggestion and had deep black charry cooking flavours and sweet pink fruity juices. The fillet was uncommonly flavourful, the sirloin unusually tender. There was no texture-taste compromise to consider, it was all good. All, all good".

Locations

Hawksmoor runs seven London restaurants, including: Air Street, Borough, Guildhall, Knightsbridge, Seven Dials, Spitalfields, and Wood Wharf.

They also run restaurants in Edinburgh, Manchester, and New York City.

Hawksmoor plans to open restaurants in Liverpool in autumn 2022 and in Dublin in spring 2023.

Awards 
In February 2020, Hawksmoor was recognized at the Best Companies to Work For special awards 2020 in the "Innovation in Engagement" category.

See also

List of restaurants in London

References

External links

 Official website

2006 establishments in England
2006 in London
Restaurants established in 2006
Companies based in the London Borough of Tower Hamlets
Restaurant chains in the United Kingdom
Restaurants in London
Tourist attractions in the London Borough of Tower Hamlets
Steakhouses